Woodside Amusement Park was an amusement park that existed inside West Fairmount Park in Philadelphia, Pennsylvania, that was constructed in 1897 by the Fairmount Park Transportation Company (FPT), and that continued  operations until 1955.  One of the coasters was transferred to the Million Dollar Pier as "The Skooter" in Atlantic City, New Jersey at the park's demise.  Other famous rides "... included the famous Hummer roller coaster, the Whip, and the Wild Cat."  The FPT's trolley line ran for around 10 miles around the park that also included parts of West Philadelphia and Strawberry Mansion. Also in the park was a third-mile wooden cycling track, which was used by Major Taylor to break many world records in 1898.

The introduction of the trolley also introduced "non-bourgeois elements", and the park lost its "middle class tone."  As a result, many who visited the park never returned and started patronage towards its competitor Willow Grove Park, which by comparison was less of an amusement park than was Woodside Park, but offered fewer concerts than its competitor. Woodside Park was comparable to New York's Coney Island and allowed residents quicker visits as it was nearby.  The Please Touch Museum now holds the Dentzel carousel that once ran in the park.

An article published in the New York Times on October 7, 1955,(P.50) stated that a syndicate of real estate investors based in Philadelphia, and headed by Lewis Silverman, had purchased the park's rides and intended to relocate the park to a new "two million dollar" amusement park to have been constructed in Levittown, Pennsylvania. However, the Levittown amusement park was never built.

References

Buildings and structures in Philadelphia
1897 establishments in Pennsylvania
1955 disestablishments in Pennsylvania
Defunct amusement parks in Pennsylvania